Events from the year 1927 in Sweden

Incumbents
 Monarch – Gustaf V
 Prime Minister – Carl Gustaf Ekman

Events

 The Volvo car manufacturing company was founded in Gothenburg, as a subsidiary to the Swedish ball bearing factory AB. 
 Forex Bank established 
 The Norra Kvill National Park established.

Arts and culture 
 The comic strip Kronblom was created by Elov Persson

Births

 30 January – Olof Palme, politician (died 1986)
 30 April – Lars Hall, modern pentathlete, Olympic champion 1952 and 1956 (died 1991).
 7 May – Åke Hansson, footballer 
 25 June – Kjell Tånnander, Swedish decathlete
 22 November – Gullan Bornemark, musician

Deaths
 7 July –  Gösta Mittag-Leffler, mathematician (born 1846)
 19 August – Johan Edman, tug-of-war competitor (born 1875).
 2 October –  Svante Arrhenius, scientist (born 1859)
 24 December – Karl Oskar Medin, paediatrician (born 1847)

References

 
Years of the 20th century in Sweden